Morupule Wanderers Football Club is a football club based in Palapye. Wanderers is also known as Bafana ba Magala or Wandy-Wandy. It is one of the best known Palapye-based teams.

At the end of the 2018-19 season, the club was promoted to the Botswana Premier League by beating First Division South runners up Jwaneng Fighters in the Botswana Premier League playoffs, ending a 46-year First Division North stay.

References

 Football clubs in Botswana